Ticket is a 1985 South Korean  film directed by Im Kwon-taek in 1985. It depicts the sometimes brutal life of Korean dabang girls. Dabangs are coffee houses in Korea and many offer outcall services in which the girls deliver coffee to customers, and sometimes extra sexual services for a price termed  a "ticket". The price of the ticket is W25,000, which the customer pays to the proprietor of the dabang. The customer and the girl usually negotiate for extra services. Sometimes the customer will take the girl to a noraebang (노래방) just to sing. At other times the customer may just enjoy the company of the young lady at a meal in a restaurant. The extra meal or the noraebang are of course paid for by the customer.

See also
 Ticket Dabang

References

External links

South Korean drama films
1985 films
Films directed by Im Kwon-taek